Nianga Bitibanda is a village in the Bamingui-Bangoran prefecture in the northern Central African Republic. It is situated nearby to the Bamingui River, and is also situated to the town of Bamingui.

References

External links
Satellite map at Maplandia.com

Populated places in Bamingui-Bangoran
Bamingui